Assemblin is an enzyme with systematic name. This enzyme catalyses the following chemical reaction

 Cleaves -Ala-Ser- and -Ala-Ala- bonds in the scaffold protein

This enzyme is coded by the herpes-virus virion.

References

External links 
 

EC 3.4.21